Ingersoll is a small unincorporated community in Alfalfa County, Oklahoma, United States.

History
Ingersoll was named for Philadelphia railroad owner, Charles E. Ingersoll.

A post office was established September 13, 1901.  The Choctaw Northern Railroad (later owned by the Chicago, Rock Island and Pacific) became the county's first railway in 1901, when it connected Ingersoll to the other Alfalfa county towns of Aline, Augusta, Lambert, Driftwood, Amorita, and then continuing on into Kansas.

After its bid to become the county seat failed, Ingersoll's prospects declined considerably.  The railroad line was abandoned in 1936.  Its post office was closed December 31, 1942.

Ingersoll formally disincorporated in December 1968.

The Ingersoll Tile Elevator (ca. 1920) was listed on the National Register of Historic Places in 1983.

Geography

See also

 National Register of Historic Places listings in Alfalfa County, Oklahoma

References

Unincorporated communities in Alfalfa County, Oklahoma
Unincorporated communities in Oklahoma